Burtia cruenta is a moth in the subfamily Arctiinae first described by Gottlieb August Wilhelm Herrich-Schäffer in 1866. It is found on Cuba.

References

Moths described in 1866
Arctiinae
Endemic fauna of Cuba